Hjalmarsson or Hjálmarsson is a patronymic surname meaning "son of Hjalmar". Notable people with the surname include:

Barbro Hjalmarsson (1919 - 2012), Swedish nurse and inventor
Gustav Hjalmarsson (born 1986), Swedish ice hockey player
Niklas Hjalmarsson (born 1987), Swedish ice hockey player
Simon Hjalmarsson (born 1989), Swedish ice hockey player
Vilhjálmur Hjálmarsson (1914–2014), Icelandic politician

Patronymic surnames
Swedish-language surnames
Surnames from given names